This is a timeline documenting events of Jazz in the year 1951.

Events

 The first American Jazz festival takes place at Wilkes-Barre, Pennsylvania in the autumn. This festival precedes the first Newport Jazz Festival.
 The tenor saxophonist Sonny Rollins, a Coleman Hawkins influenced player, joins the group of Miles Davis.

Album releases
Stan Kenton: City of Glass 
Oscar Peterson: 1951
Shorty Rogers: Modern Sounds
Lester Young: Lester Young Trio

Standards

Deaths

 January
 21 – R.Q. Dickerson, American trumpeter (born 1898).

 February
 7 – Shirley Clay, American trumpeter (born 1902).

 March
 25 – Sid Catlett, American swinging drummer (born 1910).

 May
 4 – Doc West, American drummer (born 1915).

 August
 17 – Ray Wetzel, American trumpeter (born 1924).

 October
 26 – Charlie Creath, American trumpeter, saxophonist, accordionist, and bandleader (born 1890).

 December
 3 – Cyril Blake, Trinidadian trumpeter (born 1900).
 12 – Mildred Bailey, American singer (born 1903).
 23 – Enrique Santos Discépolo, Argentine tango and milonga pianist, bandoneónist, and singer (born 1901).
 26 – Vic Berton, American jazz drummer (born 1896).

 Unknown date
 Valentin Parnakh, Russian poet, translator, historian, explorer, musician, choreographer, ballet master, best remembered as a founding father of Soviet jazz (born 1891).

Births

 January
 1 – Ashwin Batish, Indian sitar and tabla player.
 4 – Håkan Rydin, Swedish pianist.
 9 – Idris Ackamoor, American multi-instrumentalist.
 12 – Earl Howard, American saxophonist, synthesizer player and multi-instrumentalist.
 14 – Mark Egan, American bass guitarist and trumpeter.
 18 – Steve Grossman, American saxophonist.
 30
 Phil Collins, English drummer, singer-songwriter, record producer, and actor. 
 Ralph Lalama, American saxophonist.

 February
 2 – Alphonso Johnson, American bassist.
 20 – Anthony Davis, American pianist and composer.
 21
 Herb Robertson, American trumpeter and flugelhornist.
 Warren Vache, American trumpeter, cornetist, and flugelhornist.
 28 – Roseanna Vitro, American singer.

 March
 3 – Lindsay Cooper, English bassoon and oboe player, composer, and political activist (died 2013).
 7 – Rocco Prestia, American bassist, Tower of Power.
 8 – James Williams, American pianist (died 2004).
 13
 Geoff Eales, Welsh pianist, improviser, and composer.
 Michael Jefry Stevens, American pianist.
 18 – Bill Frisell, American guitarist and composer.
 21 – Fred Sturm, American composer, arranger, and teacher (died 2014).
 24 – Gregory B. Johnson, American pianist, Cameo.

 April 
 3 – Mitch Woods, American pianist and singer.
 7 – Bob Berg, American saxophonist (died 2002).
 9 – Hugh Ragin, American trumpeter.
 10 – Steve Lodder, British keyboardist, composer, and organist.
 15 – Bill MacCormick, English bassist and vocalist.
 26 – Billy Newton-Davis, Canadian singer-songwriter.
 29 – Vinicius Cantuária, Brazilian singer, songwriter, guitarist, drummer, and percussionist.
 30 – Alexander Zonjic, Canadian flutist.

 May
 3 – Krister Andersson, Swedish saxophonist and composer.
 14 – Jay Beckenstein, American saxophonist, composer, and producer, Spyro Gyra.
 28 – Richard Niles, American guitarist, composer, and record producer.
 31 – Jimmy Nalls, American guitarist and singer, Sea Level (died 2017).

 June
 15 – Mark Hennen, American pianist.
 19 – Karen Young, Canadian singer, lyricist, and composer.
 20 – Peter Gordon, American composer and musician.
 30 – Stanley Clarke, American bassist, Return to Forever.

 July
 7 – Sue Evans, American American percussionist and drummer.
 16 – Bobby Previte, American drummer, composer, and bandleader.
 21 – Pino Minafra, Italian trumpeter and flugelhornist.
 22 – Richard Bennett, American guitarist and record producer.
 29 – Charles Loos, Belgian pianist and composer.
 31 – Howard Levy, American harmonica player and multi-instrumentalist.

 August
 1 – Tommy Bolin, American guitarist, Deep Purple (died 1976).
 5 – Jemeel Moondoc, American saxophonist.
 15
 António Pinho Vargas, Portuguese composer and pianist.
 Bobby Caldwell, American singer and songwriter.
 19 – Roland Batik, Austrian pianist and composer.
 22 – Edwin Birdsong, American keyboard/organ player.

 September
 3 – Todd Cochran, American pianist, keyboard and synthesizer player, Fuse One.
 7 – Mark Isham, American trumpeter and synthesist.
 12 – Joëlle Léandre, French upright bassist, vocalist, and composer.
 15 – Carla White, American vocalist (died 2007).
 17 – Theryl DeClouet, American singer, Galactic (died 2018).
 18 – Steve Slagle, American saxophonist, flautist, and composer.
 23 – Steven Springer, American guitarist, Trinidad Tripoli Steel Band (died 2012).

 October
 2 – Sting, American singer, bassist, and guitarist, the Police.
 17 – Jukka Gustavson, Finnish organist, keyboarder, and composer.
 30
 Poncho Sanchez, Mexican-American conguero (conga player).
 Trilok Gurtu, Indian percussionist and composer.

 November
 17 – Lisle Ellis, Canadian upright bassist and composer.
 19 – Kenny Werner, American pianist and composer.
 28
 Dennis Irwin, American upright bassist (died 2008).
 Diedre Murray, American cellist and composer.
 Peter Malick, American guitarist and record producer.

 December
 1 – Jaco Pastorius, American bassist, Weather Report (died 1987).
 3 – Barry Finnerty, American guitarist, keyboardist, singer, songwriter, and arranger.
 14 – Nükhet Ruacan, Turkish singer and educator in musicology (died 2007).
 16 – Robben Ford, American guitarist, L.A. Express.
 20 – Brynjulf Blix, Norwegian pianist.
 21 – Alex Blake, American upright bassist and bass guitarist.
 26
 Brooks Kerr, American pianist (died 2018).
 John Scofield, American guitarist and composer.
 28 – Rebecca Parris, American singer (died 2018).
 31 – Jimmy Haslip, American bass guitarist, Yellowjackets.

 Unknown date
 Jon Rose, British-Australian violinist.
 Judi Silvano, American singer and composer.
 Kit McClure, American trombonist, saxophonist, and bandleader.
 La Palabra, Cuban bandleader, singer-songwriter, pianist.
 Lars Jansson, Swedish pianist and composer.
 Tom Kubis, American saxophonist, flautist, and pianist.

See also

 1950s in jazz
 List of years in jazz
 1951 in music

References

Bibliography

External links 
 History Of Jazz Timeline: 1951 at All About Jazz

Jazz
Jazz by year